Die Another Day is the debut studio album by Swedish recording artist Beatrice Eli, released on 22 October 2014 by Razzia Records. The album consists of 12 tracks, which were all produced by and cowritten with Saska Becker. The album is a personal statement of Eli's, embarking themes centered on relationships, love, passion, and break-ups.

Track listing

"Moment of Clarity" contains a sample of the song "Maneater" by Hall & Oates.

Charts

References

2014 debut albums
Beatrice Eli albums